Directions in Music: Live at Massey Hall (subtitled, Celebrating Miles Davis & John Coltrane) is a live recording by pianist Herbie Hancock, tenor saxophonist Michael Brecker and trumpeter Roy Hargrove. It was recorded on October 25, 2001 in Toronto and was Brecker's eighth and Hancock's forty-fourth album. The band is rounded out by bassist John Patitucci and drummer Brian Blade.

It won the Grammy Award for Best Jazz Instrumental Album, Individual or Group in 2003. The track "My Ship" won the Grammy for Best Jazz Instrumental Solo that same year.

Track listing
"The Sorcerer" (Herbie Hancock) – 8:53
"The Poet" (Roy Hargrove) – 6:35
"So What"/"Impressions" (Miles Davis)/(John Coltrane) – 12:51
"Misstery" (Michael Brecker, Hancock, Hargrove) – 8:16
"Naima" (Coltrane) – 7:29
"Transition" (Coltrane) – 10:26
"My Ship" (Kurt Weill, Ira Gershwin) – 8:40
"D Trane" (Brecker) – 15:09

Personnel
Herbie Hancock – piano
Michael Brecker – tenor saxophone
Roy Hargrove – trumpet, flugelhorn
John Patitucci – bass
Brian Blade – drums

References

External links
Hancock-Brecker-Hargrove at Verve Records

Michael Brecker albums
Herbie Hancock live albums
2002 live albums
Miles Davis tribute albums
Verve Records live albums
Albums recorded at Massey Hall
Grammy Award for Best Jazz Instrumental Album